The 1909 Spring Hill Badgers football team represented  Spring Hill College as an independent during the 1909 college football season.

Schedule

References

Spring Hill
Spring Hill Badgers football seasons
Spring Hill Badgers football